Paul Poatinda (born 7 December 1978) is a New Caledonian retired international footballer who played as a forward. He represented New Caledonia at the 2003 South Pacific Games.

Career statistics

International

International goals
Scores and results list New Caledonia's goal tally first.

References

External links
 

1978 births
Living people
New Caledonian footballers
New Caledonia international footballers
Association football forwards
AS Magenta players